Igoeti or Igoet'i (In Georgian: იგოეთი) is a village in Georgia in the region of Shida Kartli.  It housed 559 people in 2014 and has one river running through it.

History 

Igoeti was founded in the twelfth (XII) century. Igoeti is near the Mtkvari River (sometimes called the Kura) which has sustained the people near Igoeti and beyond for over 7,000 years. Running through Igoeti also is the Lekhura river.  Several species in the Paeonia genus have been recorded in Igoeti. Then, during the Russo-Georgian war, Russian troops stopped in Igoeti on 15 August, the closest they had gotten to Tbilisi, before a ceasefire agreement was signed.

Demographics 
Igoeti's population as of 2014 was 559. From 2002 to 2014 there was a -1.6% population decline. 51.2% of Igoeti's population is female and 48.8% of Igoeti's population is male.

Ethnic groups 
97.8% of Igoeti, or 542 people, are Georgians. 3 people, or 0.5% of the population in Igoeti are Armenians. The remaining 9 people or 1.6% of Igoeti's population have another ethnicity.

Language 
Georgian is spoken in Igoeti. Georgian is the official language in Georgia, where Igoeti is located. The Georgian Lari is used in Igoeti.

Elevation 

Important sites 

The school in Igoeti is the Igoeti Public School. Winemaking is also very popular in Igoeti. There also is a grocery store named მარკეტი (translates in English to Market). Also, there is a spice shop named Spice Igoeti and a police station. It is called the "Igoeti Police Station" (იგოეთის პოლიციის დანაყოფი). Local tradition says that you must throw coins out to the church in Igoeti while passing it in the car to travel the route safely.

Location 
Igoeti is located in Shida Kartli, which is situated in Eastern Georgia and is also in the South Caucasus region. It is located in Eurasia. Igoeti is settled on the Eurasian plate. It is near the E60 in Georgia and Europe and running through Igoeti is the Igoeti-Kaspi-Akhalkalaki Road.

Regional Codes 
Igoeti's Postal Code is 2609 and its telephone code is +995. It is located on Georgia Standard Time.

Nearby Cities 

Nearby Seas and Oceans 
Igoeti is nearest to the Black Sea, however, Igoeti is near the middle of Georgia which is surrounded not only by land but the Caspian Sea as well, so Igoeti is second-nearest to the Caspian sea as well.

Nearby Airports

See also 
 Russo-Georgian War
 Shida Kartli

References 

Populated places in Shida Kartli